Terence Dravitzki (born 11 February 1940) is a New Zealand cricketer. He played in one first-class match for Central Districts in 1962/63.

See also
 List of Central Districts representative cricketers

References

External links
 

1940 births
Living people
New Zealand cricketers
Central Districts cricketers
Cricketers from New Plymouth